Christie Lamb (born 1992) is an English-born, Australian country singer-songwriter. Lamb has released four studio albums.

Early life
Lamb was born in England and moved to Australia at 6 years of age. She found her love for the stage through dance lessons and began playing flute at primary school, before commencing piano and vocal lessons at age of ten. At 14, Christie took up guitar and began song-writing. 

Following high school, she studied a Bachelor of Music at university and travelled to Nashville, Tennessee.

Career
Lamb released her debut EP in 2011, featuring her debut single "Mr. Wrong", which reached number 4 on the Country Tracks Top 30. The EP was produced by Rod McCormack and features tracks co-written by Lamb, McCormack and fellow songwriters Jay Collie, Jasper Somerville-Collie and Gina Jeffreys.
 
In February 2014, Lamb released of her debut album, All She Wrote. Lamb undertook two writing trips to Nashville as groundwork for the album. In 2015, Lamb was awarded the fan voted CMC Award for New Oz Artist of the Year.
 
Late in 2016, Lamb signed with ABC Music. Lamb released her second studio album Loaded in February 2017.
The album was proceeded by single "Flamethrower" and launched at the Rooty Hill RSL in New South Wales.
 
In 2019, Lamb released her third studio album, Broken Lines. The album was produced by Andy Mack. About the album, Lamb said "Andy was very inclusive and wanted not just my opinion but the opinions of the other musicians in the room. We recorded it all organically, all in the same room. Then we'd play back the take and say, 'What could we change? You could add a drum fill here. I might try this different bass line here.' It was very much a group effort, this album."  Broken Lines peaked at number 15 on the ARIA Charts.
 
Lamb released her fourth studio album Truth on 30 September 2022. The album was produced by Stuart Stuart and was recorded remotely. Lamb said “When writing the songs for this album, I wanted to challenge myself whilst being entirely true to myself. I wanted to go deeper and more personal than I’ve ever gone before. This album is definitely about me growing as a person and an artist. I have written the songs on this album from life experiences, my heart and my truth."

Personal life
Lamb met Jonathan English (son of Jon English) in 2012 when Lamb during which time Lamb was lead female vocalist Jon English's Rock Revolution National Tour.
The couple were married in Gledswood Homestead in Sydney in June 2021. On 20 August 2022 Lamb gave birth their first child called Charlotte Rose English.

Discography

Studio albums

Extended plays

Awards and nominations

Country Music Awards (CMAA)
The Country Music Awards of Australia (CMAA) (also known as the Golden Guitar Awards) is an annual awards night held in January during the Tamworth Country Music Festival, celebrating recording excellence in the Australian country music industry. They have been held annually since 1973. 
 
 (wins only)
! 
|-
| 2016 || Christie Lamb - Broken Record || New Talent of the Year ||  || 
|-

CMC Awards
The CMC Awards are awarded annually by Country Music Channel Australia.

 (wins only)
! 
|-
| 2015|| Christie Lamb || New Australian Artist of the Year||  || 
|-
| 2018|| Christie Lamb || Australian Artist of the Year (female) ||  || 
|-

References

 

 

1992 births
Living people
Australian country singers
Australian women singers
Musicians from New South Wales